Quinneys is a 1927 British romance film directed by Maurice Elvey and starring John Longden, Alma Taylor and Henry Vibart. It is an adaptation of the play Quinneys  by Horace Annesley Vachell. David Lean worked on the film as a camera assistant. It was made by Gaumont British at their Lime Grove Studios.

Plot
The screenplay concerns a British furniture salesman who buys some chairs from an American dealer, only to discover that they are fakes.

Cast
 John Longden - Joseph Quinney 
 Alma Taylor - Susan Quinney 
 Henry Vibart - Lord Melchester 
 Cyril McLaglen - Jim Miggott 
 Ursula Jeans - Mabel Dredge 
 Frances Cuyler - Posy 
 Wallace Bosco - Tomlin

References

Bibliography
 Low, Rachael. History of the British Film, 1918-1929. George Allen & Unwin, 1971.
 Philips, Gene D. Beyond the Epic: The Life & Films of David Lean. University Press of Kentucky, 2006.

External links

1927 films
1920s romance films
British silent feature films
British romance films
Films set in England
British films based on plays
1920s English-language films
Films directed by Maurice Elvey
British black-and-white films
1920s British films
Films about salespeople